The 2015 ICC World Cricket League Division Six was a limited-overs international cricket tournament that took place in England from 7 to 13 September 2015. The majority of matches were played at grounds in Essex, although two matches took place in Bishop's Stortford, in the neighbouring county of Hertfordshire.

Three bids were received for the event, with Essex being named the host in February 2015, after defeating bids from Guernsey and Vanuatu. Eight teams participated in the tournament, which formed part of the 2012–18 World Cricket League and the qualification process for the 2019 World Cup. Three teams (the Cayman Islands, Guernsey, and Vanuatu) qualified based on their positions in earlier WCL tournaments, while the other five (Botswana, Fiji, Norway, Saudi Arabia, and Suriname) qualified after winning regional qualifiers.

Saudi Arabia failed to arrive for the tournament after they were unable to secure visas for their team. As a result the ICC decided to cancel all of their matches in the tournament, with Group B being reduced to three teams, Cayman Islands, Vanuatu and Norway.

The competition's final was played at the County Ground in Chelmsford, with Suriname defeating Guernsey by six wickets. Both teams were promoted to the 2016 Division Five tournament.  However, in March 2016, Suriname withdrew from the Division Five tournament due to an ICC investigation about the eligibility of some of their players. Vanuatu, who finished third overall, were named as their replacement.

Background

Qualification
Teams that qualified from previous WCL tournaments are:

 (5th in 2014 ICC World Cricket League Division Five)
 (6th in 2014 ICC World Cricket League Division Five)
 (3rd in 2013 ICC World Cricket League Division Six)

Further five teams qualified through regional competitions.
 (Americas)
 (Asia)
 (East Asia Pacific)
 (Africa)
 (Europe)

Preparation
Vanuatu prepared for the tournament by playing against teams in Australia and the Netherlands. In Australia, they played against the Penrith District Cricket Club, a team in the Sydney Grade Cricket competition, while in the Netherlands they played a three-game series against the Dutch national A-team (Netherlands A). Their previous major tournament was the Pacific Games cricket tournament in July 2015, which they won. Fiji did not field a side at the Pacific Games in favour of focusing on its WCL campaign, and played a series of warm-up games against English club sides.

Squads

Group stages

Group A

Group B

Crossover matches

5th-place semi-finals

Main semi-finals

Playoffs

7th-place playoff

5th-place playoff

3rd-place playoff

Final

Statistics

Most runs
The top five runscorers are included in this table, ranked by runs scored, then by batting average, then alphabetically by surname.

Source: ESPNcricinfo

Most wickets

The top five wicket takers are listed in this table, ranked by wickets taken and then by bowling average.

Source: ESPNcricinfo

Final standings

Notes

References

External links
 Series home at ESPNCricinfo

2015, 6
2015 in English cricket
 
International cricket competitions in England
Cricket in Essex
Cricket in Hertfordshire
2010s in Hertfordshire
2010s in Essex